The 1993 Gerry Weber Open was a men's tennis tournament played on outdoor grass courts. It was the inaugural edition of the Gerry Weber Open, and was part of the World Series of the 1993 ATP Tour. It took place at the Gerry Weber Stadion in Halle, North Rhine-Westphalia, Germany, from 14 June until 21 June 1993. Henri Leconte won the singles title.

Finals

Singles

 Henri Leconte defeated  Andrei Medvedev 6–2, 6–3
 It was Leconte's 1st singles title of the year and the 9th and last of his career.

Doubles

 Petr Korda /  Cyril Suk defeated  Mike Bauer / Marc-Kevin Goellner 7–6, 5–7, 6–3
It was Korda's 2nd title of the year and the 13th of his career. It was Suk's first title of the year and the 7th of his career.

References

External links
 Official website 
 ITF tournament edition details